N. P. Mohammed (July 1, 1928 – January 3, 2003), popularly known by his initials N. P., was an Indian novelist, short story writer and screenwriter of Malayalam language. Along with his contemporaries like M. T. Vasudevan Nair, O. V. Vijayan, Kakkanadan, and Madhavikutty, he was known to have been one of the pioneers of modernist movement in Malayalam fiction. He was the president of Kerala Sahitya Akademi and a recipient of several awards including Kendra Sahitya Akademi Award, Kerala Sahitya Akademi Award for Story, Kerala Sahitya Akademi Award for Novel, Lalithambika Antharjanam Award, Padmaprabha Literary Award and the Muttathu Varkey Award.

Biography 
N. P. Mohammed was born on July 1, 1929, at Koondungal, in the present-day Kozhikode district of the south Indian state of Kerala to N. P. Abu, a freedom fighter, and Imbichi Pathumma Beevi. N. P. Moideen, a noted politician and a member of Kerala Legislative Assembly, was his brother. Mohammed did his schooling at the local school in Koondungal, Basel Mission School, Parappanangadi, and Ganapathi School, Kozhikode before completing college education at Zamorin's Guruvayurappan College. He started his career as a clerk at a co-operative society but soon moved to the Housing Board Co-operative Society, Kozhikode where he served for the next three decades before superannuating from service as its secretary. He served as the resident editor of Kerala Kaumudi and was associated with a number of publications such as Navasahithi, Nireekshanam, Gopuram, Pradeepam and Jagratha where he served as the member of their editorial boards.

Mohammed was married to Imbichi Pathumma, the marriage taking place in 1952 and the couple had seven children, including writer and academic, N. P. Hafiz Mohamad Mohammed died on January 3, 2003, at the age of 74, succumbing to pneumonia at a private hospital in Kozhikode. His mortal remains were laid to rest at Kannamparambu Kabarstan, in the presence of his friends and dignitaries including M. T. Vasudevan Nair, U. A. Khader, P. Valsala, K. T. Mohammed, Sukumar Azhikode, M. M. Basheer, P. V. Gangadharan and U. K. Kumaran.

Legacy 
Mohammed was known to have been among the group of writers such as M. T. Vasudevan Nair, O. V. Vijayan, Kakkanadan, and Kamala Das who pioneered modernist movement in Malayalam fiction in the 1950s. His oeuvre comprises eight novels, ten short story anthologies and a number of other books. He co-wrote one his novels, Arabi Ponnu (The Arab Gold), with M. T. Vasudevan Nair; it was reported that both writers stayed together in a rented house in Karuvarakkundu village, Kozhikode for a period of two weeks to complete the work. The novel Hiranyakasipu, which tells us a story of power and politics, brings characters from Hindu mythology into a modern political setting in Kerala. His last work, Muhammad Abdurrahman, a fictional biography on the life of the noted Indian independence activist, Mohammed Abdur Rahiman, was found as manuscript after his death and was published posthumously. Three of his stories were adapted into films, Maram, Maanyamahaajanangale and Veeraputhran of which he wrote dialogues for two and screenplay for one.

Mohammed served as the president of the Kerala Sahitya Akademi from 2001 until his death in 2003. Prior to that, he was a member of the governing council of the Akademi and was a member of the Kerala Sangeetha Nataka Akademi, Kendra Sahitya Akademi and the Central Board of Film Certification. He was one of the founder members of the Islam and Modern Age Society, and was the translator of Islam Between East and West, written by Alija Izetbegović.

Awards and honours 
Mohammed received his first major award for his first novel, Thoppiyum Chattavum, in 1953 from the Government of Madras when Malabar was a part of the state of Madras. The Kerala Sahitya Akademi chose his short story anthology, Presidentinte Adyathe Maranam, for their annual award for story in 1970. A decade later, Akademi honoured him again with the Kerala Sahitya Akademi Award for Novel in 1981 for the novel, Ennappadam. He received the Kendra Sahitya Akademi Award in 1993 for his work, Daivathinte Kannu'''Awards & Fellowships-Akademi Awards  the same year as he received the Samastha Kerala Sahithya Parishad Award. In 1997, he was selected for the Lalithambika Antharjanam Smaraka Sahitya Award followed by the Padmaprabha Literary Award in 2000 and the Muttathu Varkey Award in 2001. He was also a recipient of the Padmanabha Swami Puraskaram and the C. V. Raman Pillai Award for his non-fiction work, Veera Rasam CV Krithikalil''.

List of works

Novels

Short story collections

Essays

Poetry

Children's literature

Translation

Filmography

See also 

 List of Malayalam-language authors by category
 List of Malayalam-language authors

References

Further reading

External links 
 
 

1929 births
2003 deaths
Indian Muslims
Writers from Kozhikode
Malayalam novelists
Malayalam short story writers
Malayalam-language writers
Recipients of the Sahitya Akademi Award in Malayalam
Recipients of the Kerala Sahitya Akademi Award
20th-century Indian short story writers
20th-century Indian novelists
Indian male short story writers
Indian male novelists
Novelists from Kerala
20th-century Indian male writers